Judah Friedlander (born March 16, 1969) is an American actor and comedian, known for playing the role of writer Frank Rossitano on the NBC sitcom 30 Rock. Friedlander is also known for his role as Toby Radloff in the film American Splendor, a role that garnered him favorable reviews and a nomination for best supporting actor at the 2004 Independent Spirit Awards. Earlier in his career, he was recognized as "the hug guy" from the music video for the 2001 Dave Matthews Band single "Everyday".

Friedlander is known for his distinctive look, which includes oversized glasses, shaggy hair, and a t-shirt and trucker hat (both often emblazoned with slogans such as "world champion"), and a generally unkempt appearance. It is a look he maintains as a stand-up comedian, during most of his public appearances, and which he has employed in some of his acting roles.

Early life
Friedlander was born in Gaithersburg, Maryland, the son of Shirley and Art Friedlander. His father was of Russian Jewish descent and his mother, a native of Pittsburgh, is Croatian American.

As a child, Friedlander drew political cartoons and made animated films. He first tried stand-up comedy in 1989 at the age of 19 while attending New York University. Friedlander graduated from the Gallatin School of Individualized Study.

Career

Stand-up comedy
Friedlander has performed stand-up comedy regularly throughout his entertainment career. He continued to perform stand-up several nights a week in New York City while working on the sitcom 30 Rock. Friedlander has stated that he is most relaxed when doing stand-up and that he considers stand-up to be his first true love, preferring it to acting. He stated in 2012 that stand-up comedy is "still the most important thing I do from an artistic standpoint."

Friedlander has cited comedians Steven Wright, Sam Kinison and John Mulrooney as influences. He also says that Dave Attell is one of his favorite comics.

Friedlander's comedic performances often feature him making outrageous and bombastic claims about himself with a deadpan delivery. Many of these claims are reflected in slogans displayed on the many trucker hats he wears — the most common being "World Champion", a slogan he has worn in various languages.

One of his claims include being an expert in karate, having achieved an "extra-dark black belt" in the sport. In 2010, he authored the humor book How to Beat Up Anybody: An Instructional and Inspirational Karate Book by the World Champion. Friedlander's claims provide comedic irony when contrasted against his nonchalant attitude and physical appearance. Friedlander wears large, thick-rimmed glasses, is often unshaven and is generally unkempt.

The look that Friedlander employs during his stand-up has also carried over into some of his television and film roles, including his 30 Rock role as TV writer Frank Rossitano. Frank is however much lazier than Friedlander's "World Champion" persona.

In 2007, Heeb magazine included Friedlander in their list of "100 people you need to know about".

Television
Friedlander played the role of a techie on the Al Franken sitcom LateLine in 1999. Over the 2000s Friedlander held guest roles on several television shows, including Spin City, Curb Your Enthusiasm and Flight of the Conchords, as well as providing voices for characters on the animated series Wonder Showzen and Xavier: Renegade Angel. Friedlander made regular appearances on the entertainment and pop-culture program Best Week Ever. He appeared as the online co-host of the 2009 TV Land Awards, alongside main stage host Neil Patrick Harris.

Friedlander was a regular cast member of the sitcom 30 Rock throughout its entire run, from October 11, 2006, to January 31, 2013. His character, Frank Rossitano, is a sarcastic and wisecracking writer on the fictional show TGS with Tracy Jordan Frank is lazy, slovenly, and lives with his mother (played by Patti Lupone). He is also sex-obsessed, which he often reveals by way of vulgar and sexually suggestive comments. Friedlander has stated that Frank Rossitano is based on at least two writers with whom Tina Fey used to work at Saturday Night Live. His ever-changing, slogan-bearing trucker hats also became a running gag on the show. Friedlander makes his hats himself and created enough of them to be able to wear a different one in each scene of 30 Rock, which is about three hats per show.

Friedlander has appeared on late-night talk shows such as Late Night with Conan O'Brien, The Daily Show with Jon Stewart, The Daily Show with Trevor Noah, The Tonight Show with Jay Leno, Late Night with Jimmy Fallon and Last Call with Carson Daly. In 2010 Friedlander appeared in 2 episodes of the children's series Sesame Street. He also appeared as a panelist on The Burn with Jeff Ross in 2013.

In May and June 2014, Friedlander narrated ESPN's Inside: U.S. Soccer’s March to Brazil six-part series in preparation for the World Cup in Brazil.

He has appeared on MSNBC's Last Word With Lawrence O'Donnell and provided personal commentary on The World Cup and soccer in general.

Film and video
In 2001, Friedlander played "the hug guy" in the music video for the Dave Matthews Band single "Everyday"; his character is seen hugging various people throughout the video. Friedlander was recognized for his "hug guy" role for years after appearing in the video, causing complete strangers to offer him hugs. The same year, he appeared in the comedy film Wet Hot American Summer.

In 2003 Friedlander played Toby Radloff in the biopic American Splendor, a role that received favorable reviews — his performance was deemed "unforgettable" by The New York Times and "pitch-perfect" by both Nick A. Zaino III of The Boston Globe and Dan Dinicola of The Daily Gazette. He was also nominated in the category of best supporting actor at the 2004 Independent Spirit Awards.

Friedlander had roles in the Ben Stiller films Meet the Parents, Zoolander and Along Came Polly.

He had a starring role in the 2005 independent comedy Full Grown Men and a supporting role in the 2008 drama The Wrestler.

He has also appeared in films such as Duane Hopwood, Chapter 27, Southern Belles, Live Free or Die, and Feast.

Personal life
Friedlander has lived in the New York City area for most of his career, with the exception of two years spent in Los Angeles. Currently residing in Queens, he has stated that he prefers living in New York.

Friedlander enjoys playing table tennis. As a child, he had played the sport competitively, and he took it up again in 2008. He is a big fan of professional wrestling, which is often used as subject matter for his trademark hats and shirts. He is also a fan of the New York Red Bulls, has attended games at Red Bull Arena and appeared in commercials for the team.

Filmography

Film

Television

References

External links

Judah Friedlander on Myspace
Judah Friedlander's Blog on Fancast

1969 births
Living people
20th-century American male actors
21st-century American male actors
20th-century American comedians
21st-century American comedians
21st-century American Jews
American male film actors
American male television actors
American male voice actors
American people of Croatian descent
American people of Russian-Jewish descent
American stand-up comedians
Comedians from New York (state)
Jewish American male actors
Jewish American male comedians
Male actors from Maryland
People from Gaithersburg, Maryland
People from Queens, New York